Peter Bowman "Bo" Rutledge is the Dean and the Herman E. Talmadge Chair of Law at the University of Georgia School of Law in Athens, Georgia. An American attorney, academic and a specialist in international business transactions, international dispute resolution, litigation, arbitration, and the U.S. Supreme Court, he served as a law clerk for Associate U.S. Supreme Court Justice Clarence Thomas in 1998.

Professional career
Rutledge received his undergraduate degree, magna cum laude and Phi Beta Kappa, from Harvard University and an M.Litt. in Applied Ethics from the University of Aberdeen on a Rotary International Ambassadorial Scholarship. He earned his J.D. degree with high honors from the University of Chicago Law School, where he was the Tony Patiño Scholar, served as Executive Editor of the University of Chicago Law Review, and was inducted into the Order of the Coif. He clerked for renowned feeder judge U.S. Court of Appeals Judge J. Harvie Wilkinson III in 1997. After clerking with Supreme Court Justice Thomas, Rutledge practiced law as an attorney at Wilmer Cutler Pickering Hale and Dorr and Freshfields Bruckhaus Deringer. While in practice he wrote and filed over thirty briefs and petitions in the Supreme Court of the United States, as well as over thirty-five briefs in federal appellate courts and state supreme courts, for corporations, industry associations, and individuals. In 2008, the United States Supreme Court appointed Rutledge as amicus curiae to brief and argue the case before the U. S. Supreme Court of Irrizary v. United States. He subsequently won the case, joining the ranks of a select few advocates who have successfully defended a judgment below when the government refused to do so. He also joined the John McCain's 2008 presidential campaign as a judicial advisory committee member.

Teaching career
In 2003, Rutledge accepted a teaching position as an associate professor of law at the Columbus School of Law at The Catholic University of America, and was chosen as Professor of the Year for four consecutive years. In 2008, he accepted a position as a tenured associate professor of law at the University of Georgia School of Law. He served as the law school's Associate Dean for Faculty Development from 2013-2014, and became its Dean on January 1, 2015.
Rutledge teaches Civil Procedure, International Business Transactions and International Litigation and Arbitration. He has lectured at universities such as Oxford University and Cambridge University as well as teaching as a Fulbright Professor at the Institut für Zivilverfahrensrecht. Besides his teaching and writing, Rutledge is sought for legal advice and expertise on matters such as litigation, arbitration, the U.S. Supreme Court and international dispute resolution including appearing as an expert witness in both litigation and arbitration, and multiple times testifying before the U.S. Congress on pending legislation.

Examples of published works
Born, Gary and Peter B. Rutledge. (1st published 2006) (4th, 5th & 6th eds.). International Civil Litigation in United States Courts. Aspen Publishers. 

Peter B. Rutledge. (2012). Arbitration and the Constitution. Cambridge University Press. 

Additionally, Rutledge has been published by several publishers including, without limitation, the Oxford University Press, the Yale University Press and the Cambridge University Press, and has had articles appear in several journals and law reviews such as University of Chicago Law Review, Vanderbilt Law Review and Journal of International Arbitration, for a total of at least 39 authorships.

In 2008, Rutledge published a paper on behalf of the U.S. Chamber Institute for Legal Reform disputing the premise of a report by Public Citizen.  The Public Citizen report said that private arbitration lacked necessary safeguards to protect consumers and that consumers lost 94 percent of cases (mostly involving debt collection) adjudicated by arbitration firm National Arbitration Forum.  A subsequent lawsuit by Minnesota Attorney General Lori Swanson revealed that the National Arbitration Forum secretly assisted the Chamber on that report. The lawsuit further revealed that the National Arbitration Forum had extensive ties to the debt collection industry. Shortly thereafter, the National Arbitration Forum agreed to a settlement under which it agreed to cease handling arbitration cases involving consumers.

Finally, Rutledge has performed peer-review work for publications such as the Stanford Law Review, the Oxford University Press, and others, and has conducted workshops and given speeches for such organizations as the Columbia University Law School, University of Georgia School of Law, New York University Law School, University of Virginia Law School, Vanderbilt University Law School, London School of Economics, Faculty of Law, University of Oxford, Washington University School of Law, American Bar Association, and many others.

See also 
 List of law clerks of the Supreme Court of the United States (Seat 10)

References

External links
Faculty profile at the University of Georgia School of Law
SSRN Author Page
Amicus curiae brief for Irrizary.
 U.S. Supreme Court cases. Oyez.com.

Legal educators
American legal scholars
Harvard University alumni
University of Chicago Law School alumni
Law clerks of the Supreme Court of the United States
University of Georgia faculty
Columbus School of Law faculty
Living people
Deans of law schools in the United States
International law scholars
Wilmer Cutler Pickering Hale and Dorr associates
Year of birth missing (living people)